Stevie Davies is a Welsh novelist, essayist and short story writer. She was elected a fellow of the Royal Society of Literature in 1998, and is also a fellow of the Welsh Academy. Her novel The Element of Water was longlisted for the Booker Prize in 2001, and won the Wales Book of the Year in 2002.

Early life
Stevie Davies was born in Salisbury, England, but lived in Wales from when she was a week old. The Davies family lived in Morriston, a large town located within the city of Swansea. The only child of an RAF officer, Davies left Wales at the age of two and spent a nomadic childhood in Egypt, Germany and Scotland in the 1950s. After studying at the University of Manchester, Davies went on to lecture in the English department there. Concurrently she married Douglas Brooks another lecturer at Manchester who adopted the name Douglas Brooks-Davies.

Career

Davies has published widely in the fields of fiction, literary criticism, biography and popular history. Her non-fiction work includes titles on the Brontë family, John Milton and Henry Vaughan. Davies' first novel, Boy Blue, was published by The Women's Press in 1987, and won the Fawcett Society Book Prize later that year. In 2001, Davies' novel The Element of Water was longlisted for the Booker Prize. It went on to win the 2002 Arts Council of Wales Book of the Year award.

Personal life
Davies has three grown children, a son and two daughters. She is Professor of Creative Writing at Swansea University, and lives in Mumbles.

Publications

Fiction
 1987: Boy Blue, The Women's Press
 1990: Primavera, The Women's Press
 1992: Arms and the Girl''', The Women's Press
 1994: Closing the Book, The Women's Press
 1996: Four Dreamers and Emily, The Women's Press
 1997: The Web of Belonging, The Women's Press
 1999: Impassioned Clay, The Women's Press
 2001: The Element of Water, The Women's Press
 2004: Kith & Kin, Weidenfeld & Nicolson
 2007: The Eyrie, Weidenfeld & Nicolson
 2010: Into Suez, Parthian
 2013: Awakening, Parthian
 2016: Equivocator, Parthian
 2017: Arrest Me, for I Have Run Away, Parthian

Non-fiction
 1978: Renaissance Views of Man, Manchester University Press
 1983: Emily Brontë: The Artist as a Free Woman, Carcanet
 1983: Images of Kingship in Paradise Lost: Milton's Politics and Christian Liberty, University of Missouri Press
 1986: The Idea of Woman in Renaissance English Literature: The Feminine Reclaimed, The Harvester Press (also published as: The Feminine Reclaimed: The Idea of Woman in Spenser, Shakespeare and Milton, The University Press of Kentucky)
 1988: Emily Brontë – Key Women Writers Series, Harvester Press
 1989: Virginia Woolf's To the Lighthouse, Penguin Critical Studies
 1991: Milton – New Readings Series, Harvester Wheatsheaf
 1993: Shakespeare's Twelfth Night, Penguin Critical Studies
 1994: Emily Brontë: Heretic, The Women's Press
 1994: John Donne – Writers and their Work, New Series, Northcote House (in association with the British Council)
 1995: Shakespeare's The Taming of the Shrew, Penguin Critical Studies
 1995: Henry Vaughan, Seren
 1998: Emily Brontë – Writers and Their Work, New Series, Northcote House (in association with the British Council)
 1998: Unbridled Spirits: Women of the English Revolution 1640 – 1660, The Women's Press
 2001: A Century of Troubles: England 1600 – 1700, Channel 4 Books

As editor
 1976: The Brontë Sisters: Selected Poems, Carcanet
 2003: Dreams and Other Aggravations: Selected Poems by Carla Lane'', Earth Ventures

References

External links

Davies' official website

Living people
Welsh scholars and academics
Welsh biographers
Welsh novelists
Fellows of the Royal Society of Literature
Academics of Swansea University
People from Swansea
People from Morriston
21st-century British novelists
21st-century Welsh novelists
21st-century Welsh writers
Year of birth missing (living people)